John Senescall (31 May 1853 – 4 November 1937) was an English cricketer. Senescall was a right-handed batsman who bowled right-arm fast. He was born at Greetham, Rutland.

Senescall made his first-class debut for Sussex against Yorkshire in 1882. He made five further first-class appearances for the county, the last of which came against Hampshire in 1883. In his six first-class matches, he took 18 wickets at an average of 15.22, with best figures of 6/23. These figures represented his only five-wicket haul and came against Hampshire in 1882. With the bat, he scored 26 runs at a batting average of 2.88, with a high score of 8.

He died at Melton, Yorkshire, on 4 November 1937.

References

External links
John Senescall at ESPNcricinfo
John Senescall at CricketArchive

1853 births
1937 deaths
Cricketers from Rutland
English cricketers
Sussex cricketers